Alina Wojtas (born 21 March 1987) is a Polish handball player for Zagłębie Lubin and the Polish national team.

She represented Poland at the 2013 World Women's Handball Championship in Serbia.

References

External links
Player profile at the Polish Handball Association website 

Polish female handball players
1987 births
Living people
Sportspeople from Nowy Sącz
Expatriate handball players
Polish expatriates in Norway
21st-century Polish women